Gens Volumnia was an ancient Roman patrician family of Etruscan origin, attested as early as the seventh century BC. It is known first of all from Volumnia, wife of Coriolanus, an illustrious person who lived in the 5th century BC; secondly, from a Publius Volumnius Gallus, who served as consul as early as 461 BC.

Despite its ancient origins, this gens never attained positions of particular importance in the history of the Republic.

The Volumnii were distinguished in two branches, the Volumni Galli, distinguished by the agnomen Amintinus, and the Volumni Fiamma with the agnomen Violens.

Very few members of this gens are mentioned without a cognomen; among these we should mention the aforementioned Volumnia, wife of Gaius Marcius Coriolanus, famous in the history of Rome because, supported by her mother-in-law Veturia, she succeeded in dissuading her husband, who had incited the Volsci against Rome, from fighting against his own people.

Other noted members of Gens Volumnia:
Lucius Volumnius Flamma Violens, first consul of plebeian origin in 307 BC and 296 BC
Publius Volumnius Amintinus Gallus, Consul in 461 BC
Marcus Volumnius, who was assassinated by Catiline during the dictatorship of Sulla
Publius Volumnius. Roman philosopher and friend and companion of Marcus Junius Brutus
Lucius Volumnius, senator and close friend of Cicero

References

 
Roman gentes